Roger Alexander Manríque Laorca (born 23 March 1999) is a Venezuelan footballer who plays as a defender for Aragua F.C. in the Venezuelan Primera División.

Career

Aragua
A graduate of the club's youth academy, Manríque made his competitive debut on 24 March 2019 in a 2–1 away victory over Estudiantes de Caracas.

References

1999 births
Living people
Aragua FC players
Venezuelan Primera División players
Venezuelan footballers
Association football defenders
Sportspeople from Maracay
21st-century Venezuelan people